Callimetopus illecebrosus is a species of beetle in the family Cerambycidae. It was described by Francis Polkinghorne Pascoe in 1865, originally under the genus Euclea. It is known from Sulawesi. It contains the varietas Callimetopus illecebrosus var. castus.

References

Callimetopus
Beetles described in 1865